Dobbratz Glacier is a broad tributary glacier which drains the south part of the White Escarpment and flows northeast between the Watlack Hills and the Webers Peaks into Splettstoesser Glacier, in the Heritage Range. It was named by the University of Minnesota Geological Party, 1963–64, for Major Joseph Dobbratz, a United States Marine Corps pilot who supported the party.

See also
 List of glaciers in the Antarctic
 Glaciology

References 

 

Glaciers of Ellsworth Land